Gasworks Newstead  is the commercial, residential and retail development at Newstead, Brisbane, Queensland, Australia.

The upscale retail precinct includes restaurants, cafes, shops, a supermarket, and a public plaza inside the old gas holder of the heritage-listed Newstead Gasworks.

The tall iron structure of the No. 2 gas holder on Skyring Terrace is a remnant of the Gasworks, which was established in 1887 as Brisbane's second gas works. The structure, however, was originally located at the Petrie Bight gasworks, where it was erected in 1873.

Planning approval was given to the project in 2008.

The first stage of the development was opened in August 2013. Part of the stage 1 development was a retail precinct which features a PTFE tensile membrane roof over the breezeway.

Gasworks includes seven buildings featuring 17,000 square metres of retail, 103,500 square metres of commercial and about 750 residential apartments.

See also
Gasworks

References

External links
 

Office buildings in Brisbane
Office buildings completed in 2013
Modernist architecture in Australia
Industrial buildings completed in 1887
2013 establishments in Australia
Tourist attractions in Brisbane
Shopping centres in Brisbane